Tjena, vi är Busungarna was released in December 1984, and is a studio album by Busungarna. The album consists of something as uncommon as Christmas songs on an album that's not a strictly Christmas album. The theme of changing seasons returns with the final track "Äntligen sommarlov.

Track listing

Side A
Tjena, vi är Busungarna
Jag ska bli rockstjärna när jag blir stor
Doktor Pop presenterar Busungarnas rockfavoriter
Be-Bop-A-Lula
Cadillac
Do You Wanna Dance?
Vi vill ha fred
Busvitsar

Side B
Tomten, jag vill ha en riktig jul
Julbus runt granen
Hej tomtegubbar
Nu har vi ljus här i vårt hus (Julpolska)
Nu är det jul igen
Busvitsar, part 2
Jag ska rymma
Doktor Pop tackar
Äntligen sommarlov

References

1984 albums